The British Hospitals Association was established by Henry Burdett in 1884.

In 1887 it established a register of trained nurses for those who could show that they had worked for at least a year in a hospital or an infirmary and had been trained in the duties of a nurse. 
 
It ran a Nurses Co-operative in the early years of the twentieth century which employed 500 nurses and had a turnover of £50,000 a year.

Sir Arthur Stanley was chairman in 1924.

Bernard Docker was the chairman in 1941.  It was involved in discussions about the organisation of the future National Health Service, particularly about the regional hospital boards.  It supported the objective of a free comprehensive health service, but warned that transfer of ownership of hospitals would lead to autocratic bodies taking the place of locally elected committees.

References

Hospitals in the United Kingdom
Health care industry trade groups based in the United Kingdom